Lavena may refer to:

Lavena Ponte Tresa
Lavena Back
Lavena Johnson